Peter Norfolk defeated the defending champion David Wagner in the final, 4–6, 6–4, 6–2 to win the quad singles wheelchair tennis title at the 2012 Australian Open.

Seeds
 David Wagner (final)
 Peter Norfolk (champion)

Draw

Final

Round robin
Standings are determined by: 1. number of wins; 2. number of matches; 3. in two-players-ties, head-to-head records; 4. in three-players-ties, percentage of sets won, or of games won; 5. steering-committee decision.
Source:

References

External links 
 Australian Open

Wheelchair Quad Singles
2012 Quad Singles